Dress Parade is a 1927 American silent romantic drama film produced by William Sistrom and Cecil B. DeMille and distributed by Pathé. The film stars William Boyd and Bessie Love, and was directed by Donald Crisp. Although it is based on a story by Major Robert Glassburn, Major Alexander Chilton, and Herbert David Walter, the plot is essentially the same as West Point, produced at MGM in 1928.

Dress Parade is preserved at the Berkeley Art Museum and Pacific Film Archive and the UCLA Film and Television Archive, and has been released on home video by Grapevine Video.

Production 
For authenticity, many scenes were filmed at West Point. Actress Bessie Love was so impressed by her time on location that she penned an unpublished novel based on her experiences, Military Mary.

Plot 
Civilian Vic Donovan (Boyd) visits West Point, and falls for beautiful Janet Cleghorne (Love), daughter of the commandant (Geldart). He successfully wins an appointment to the Academy, where he and Stuart Haldane (Allan), another cadet, vie for Janet's affection. Their competition escalates, nearly resulting in Haldane's dismissal, but Donovan takes responsibility, and Janet falls in love with him.

Cast 
 William Boyd as Vic Donovan
 Bessie Love as Janet Cleghorne
 Hugh Allan as Stuart Haldane
 Walter Tennyson as Dusty Dawson
 Maurice Ryan as Mealy Snodgrass
 Louis Natheaux as Patsy Dugan
 Clarence Geldart (as Clarence Geldert) as Commandant

Release and reception 
The film received positive reviews, and the performances of Boyd, Natheaux, and Allen were especially praised.

The film was screened to War Department officials in Washington, D.C. Adjutant General Lutz Wahl was a fan of the film, and wrote a letter to his commanding officers to support the film's success in local theaters in any way they could. In Los Angeles, a military-themed parade with star William Boyd led to a showing for 200 troops, and in Providence, Rhode Island, an army band played in the lobby of a theater.

References

External links 

 
 
 
 
 
 Still of Bessie Love and Hugh Allen (incorrectly labeled as William Boyde)

1927 romantic drama films
1927 films
American black-and-white films
American romantic drama films
American silent feature films
Films directed by Donald Crisp
Films set in the United States Military Academy
Pathé Exchange films
Surviving American silent films
1920s American films
Silent romantic drama films
Silent American drama films